Quazi Rosy (also spelled Quazy Rosy; 1 January 1949 – 20 February 2022) was a Bangladeshi poet who served also as member of the parliament. She is known for Pothghat Manusher Naam and Amar Piraner Kono Map Nei.

Early life
Rosy was born on 1 January 1949 in Satkhira District of the then East Pakistan. Her father was Quazi Shahidul Islam. She obtained her Bachelor and master's degree in Bangla Literature from the University of Dhaka.

Career
Rosy started her career by joining in the government service and retired as an Officer from Press Information Department in 2007. She was elected to parliament from reserved seats (Seat no. 41) for women after the 10th Bangladeshi parliamentary election held on 5 January 2014. She received Bangla Academy Literary Award in the year 2018 for her contribution in poetry and Ekushey Padak in 2021 for her contribution to language and literature.

Personal life and death
In 2013, Rosy testified as the 4th witness against the convicted war criminal and former Jamaat leader Abdul Quader Molla standing trial for charges of crimes against humanity at International Crimes Tribunal.

After testing positive for COVID-19, on 30 January 2022, Rosy was admitted to Square Hospital. After suffering a stroke, she died on 20 February 2022, at the age of 73.

Works
 Pothghat Manusher Naam
 Amar Piraner Kono Map Nei

Awards
 Bangla Academy Literary Award (2018)
 Ekushey Padak (2021)

References

1949 births
2022 deaths
10th Jatiya Sangsad members
21st-century Bangladeshi women politicians
Bangladeshi women poets
Recipients of Bangla Academy Award
Recipients of the Ekushey Padak
Women members of the Jatiya Sangsad
People from Satkhira District
Deaths from the COVID-19 pandemic in Bangladesh